The 1960 Georgia Tech Yellow Jackets football team represented the Georgia Institute of Technology during the 1960 NCAA University Division football season. The Yellow Jackets were led by 16th-year head coach Bobby Dodd, and played their home games at Grant Field in Atlanta.

After a quick jump to #10 in the AP Poll after their first two victories, the Yellow Jackets fell on the wrong side of several close games, finishing the year with a disappointing 5–5 record. The average margin of defeat in their five losses was only 2.2 points, and all were one-score games. Their first loss was to a Florida Gators team that featured Bobby Dodd's son, Robert Jr., at quarterback.

Schedule

Sources:

References

Georgia Tech
Georgia Tech Yellow Jackets football seasons
Georgia Tech Yellow Jackets football